This is a list of notable Swiss Americans, including both original immigrants who obtained American citizenship and their American descendants.

To be included in this list, the person must have a Wikipedia article showing they are Swiss American or must have references showing they are Swiss American and are notable.

Pioneers
 Peter Luginbill (1818–1886), born in France as the son of Mennonite parents exiled from the Emmental, early settler in Indiana and founder of the city of Berne
 John Sutter (1803–1880), born in Germany of a Swiss father, Californian famous for his association with the California Gold Rush (in that gold was discovered by James W. Marshall in Sutter's Mill) and for establishing Sutter's Fort in an area that would later become the capital of California, Sacramento
 John Augustus Sutter, Jr. (1826–1897), his son, a U.S. Consul to Acapulco, Mexico and the founder and planner of the City of Sacramento, California
Theobald (Diebold) von Erlach (1541–1565), first Swiss person known to have settled in North America.
 Wright brothers, Aviation pioneers, mother of partial Swiss descent
 John Joachim Zubly (1724–1781) of St. Gallen, pastor, planter, and statesman during the American Revolution

List by occupation

Business
 Robert Abplanalp (1922–2003), businessman, inventor of the aerosol valve
 Steve Ballmer (born 1956), businessman and CEO of Microsoft Corporation
 Henry Clay Frick (1849–1919), industrialist and art patron, once known as "America's most hated man". as per CNBC one of the "Worst American CEOs of All Time".
 Meyer Guggenheim (1828–1905), statesman, patriarch of Guggenheim family
 Simon Guggenheim (1867–1941), businessman, politician, and philanthropist
 Steve Jobs (1955–2011), information technology entrepreneur and inventor
 Milton Hershey (1857–1945), confectioner, philanthropist, and founder of The Hershey Chocolate Company
 Otto Frederick Hunziker (1873–1959), pioneer in the American and international dairy industry
 S. S. Kresge (1867–1966), merchant, philanthropist and founder of the S. S. Kresge Company, now Sears Holdings Corporation.
 Robert Lutz (born 1932), General Motors Vice Chairman of Product Development and Chairman of GM North America, the world's largest automaker
 Mark Spitznagel (born 1971), hedge fund manager
 James G. Sterchi (1867–1932), furniture store magnate
 Bruce Tognazzini (born 1945), usability consultant in partnership the Nielsen Norman Group
 Albert Lee Ueltschi (1917–2012), considered the father of modern flight training and was the founder of FlightSafety

Arts and entertainment

Actors and directors
 René Murat Auberjonois (1940–2019), film actor
 Theda Bara (1885–1955), silent film actress and sex symbol
 Wallace Beery (1885–1949), film actor
 Berry Berenson (1948–2001), photographer, actress, and model, mother of part Swiss descent
 Marisa Berenson (born 1947), actress and model
 Amy Brenneman (born 1964), film and TV actress, father of part Swiss descent
Jeff Bridges (born 1949), actor, singer, and producer
 Yul Brynner (1920–1985), actor, father of part Swiss descent
 James Caviezel (born 1968), film actor, paternal grandfather of Swiss descent
 Emily Deschanel (born 1976), actress, director, and producer
 Billie Dove (1903–1997), film actress
 Robert Downey Jr. (born 1965), actor, mother of partial Swiss descent
 Jon Hall (1915–1979), actor, Swiss father
 Nina Hartley (born 1959), porn actress and director
 David Hayter (born 1969), actor and voice actor
 Tyler Hoechlin (born 1987), film actor, father of part Swiss descent
 Melia Kreiling (born 1990), actress
 Q'Orianka Kilcher (born 1990), singer and actress, of part Swiss descent
 Taylor Lautner (born 1992), actor
 Karina Lombard (born 1969), actress
 George Lucas (born 1944), film director, of part Swiss descent
 Bridget Marquardt (born 1975), model, actress
 Victor Mature (1913–1999), film actor
 Nick Offerman (born 1970), actor, writer, comedian, and professional carpenter
Jodi Ann Paterson (born 1975), model, actress and former beauty queen
 Michelle Pfeiffer (born 1958), film actress, maternal grandfather of Swiss descent
Chris Pratt (born 1979), actor
 Ben Pronsky (born 1978), voice actor
 Kelly Rohrbach (born 1990), model and actress
 Ryan Seacrest (born 1974), television and radio host, television producer, and entrepreneur, of part Swiss descent
 August Schellenberg (1936–2013), actor
 Liev Schreiber (born 1967), film actor, father of part Swiss descent
 Meryl Streep (born 1949), film actress, father of part Swiss descent
 Evelyn Ward (1923–2012), actress
 Paul Walker (1973–2013), actor
 William Wyler (1902–1981), film director 
 Darryl F. Zanuck (1902–1979), film producer and director 
 Renée Zellweger (born 1969), film actress, Swiss-born father
 Denis Ooi, actor, Swiss-British-United States Citizen

Visual artists
 Scott Indermaur, photographer
 Herbert Matter (1907–1984), photographer and graphic designer
 Adolfo Müller-Ury (1862–1947), portrait and impressionistic still-life painter
 Jeremiah Theus (1716–1774) of Chur, painter

Writers and publicists
 Fernand Auberjonois (1910–2004), journalist, foreign correspondent of the Pittsburgh Post-Gazette and the Toledo Blade
 Lisa Brennan-Jobs (born 1978), writer, daughter of Steve Jobs
 William F. Buckley Jr. (1925–2008), writer
 Henry J. Eyring, author, educator, president of Brigham Young University-Idaho
 A. C. Frieden  (born 1966), novelist
 Katherine Indermaur, poet, author, and editor
 Lorin Morgan-Richards, author and illustrator
 Sofia Samatar (born 1971), poet and writer
 Mona Simpson (born 1957), novelist
 Wendy Watson Nelson, Canadian-American, author, lecturer, educator, associate professor at University of Calgary
 Tessa Gräfin von Walderdorff (born 1994), writer and socialite
 Eudora Alice Welty  (1909–2001), writer; ancestry can be traced to Emmental Valley of Switzerland; Swiss ancestral name Wälti

Musicians
 Melissa Auf der Maur (born 1972), singer
 Leon Botstein (born 1946), conductor
 Rudolph Ganz (1877–1972), pianist, conductor and composer
 Edna Indermaur (1892–1985), singer
 Yung Gravy (born 1996), rapper, songwriter and producer.
 Jewel (born 1974), singer-songwriter, actress, philanthropist, and author
 Cyndi Lauper (born 1953), singer-songwriter and actress
 Karina Lombard (born 1969), singer and actress
 Elvis Perkins (born 1976), singer-songwriter
Tom Petty (1950–2017), singer-songwriter, musician, record producer, and actor
 Dee Snider (born 1955), singer-songwriter
Eddie Vedder (born 1964), singer-songwriter and musician
Adam Yauch "MCA" (1964–2012), rapper, bass player, filmmaker, and founding member of the hip hop group Beastie Boys

Other
 Mary Katherine Campbell (1905–1990), only Miss America winner to hold beauty title twice, 1922 & 1923; mother was of partial Swiss ancestry
 Gary Gygax (1938–2008), writer and game designer, co-creator of Dungeons & Dragons

Law and politics

Governors and presidents
 Anthony Brown (born 1961), Governor of Maryland
 Dwight D. Eisenhower (1890–1969), President of the United States
 Herbert Hoover (1874–1964), President of the United States
 Robert B. Meyner (1908–1990), Governor of New Jersey
 Barack Obama (born 1961), President of the United States (distant ancestors)
 Emanuel L. Philipp (1861–1925), Governor of Wisconsin
 Gretchen Whitmer (1971), Governor of Michigan

Congressmen and senators
 James L. Buckley (born 1923), Senator of New York
 Albert Gallatin (1761–1849), U.S. Secretary of the Treasury, Senator of Pennsylvania, diplomat
 James William Good (1866–1929), Congressman Iowa
 Herbert Hoover Jr. (1903–1960), Under Secretary of State
 Amy Klobuchar (born 1960), Senator of Minnesota
 James S. Negley (1826–1901), Congressman Pennsylvania
 Robert Portman (born 1955), Senator of  Ohio
 Benjamin F. Welty (1870–1962), Congressman from Allen County, Ohio; ancestry traced back to Emmental Valley, Switzerland; Swiss ancestral name Wälti

Other
 Warren E. Burger (1907–1995), Chief Justice of the United States from 1969 to 1986
 Tucker Carlson (born 1969), political commentator and talk show host
 August Claessens (1885–1954), politician, best known as one of the five New York Assemblymen
 Albert Gallatin (1761–1849), politician, ethnologist, linguist, founder of New York University, diplomat, and United States Secretary of the Treasury
 Arthur L. Gilliom (1886-1968), Indiana Attorney General from 1925 to 1929
 Fred Iklé (1924–2011), Under Secretary of Defense for Policy
 Thomas M. Honan (1867-1932), Speaker of the Indiana House of Representatives (from 1908 to 1910) and Indiana Attorney General (from 1911 to 1915)
 J. Edgar Hoover (1935–1972), first Director of the FBI
 Wally Schirra (1923–2007), astronaut, only person to fly in all of America's first three space programs (Mercury, Gemini and Apollo)
 Joseph A. Shakspeare (1837–1896), politician, elected mayor of New Orleans from 1880 to 1882
 Samuel F. Snively (1859–1952), Mayor of Duluth, Minnesota
 Peter Staub (1827–1904), Mayor of Knoxville, Tennessee
 Mike Thompson (born 1951), California House of Representatives
 William Wirt (1772–1834), author and statesman who is credited with turning the position of United States Attorney General into one of influence; Swiss father.
 Henry Wisner (1720–1790), patriot leader during the American Revolution and New York representative in the Continental Congress. 
 Dan Zumbach (born 1960), Iowa Senator

Military
 Henry Bouquet, prominent Army officer in the French and Indian War and Pontiac's War
 Edward Walter Eberle (1864–1929), admiral in the United States Navy, served as Superintendent of the United States Naval Academy and third Chief of Naval Operations
 Al Ulmer (1916-2000), a major head of U.S. intelligence operations during World War II and part of the Cold War
 Henry Wirz (1822–1865), only Confederate soldier executed in the aftermath of the American Civil War for war crimes
 Felix Zollicoffer (1812–1862), newspaperman, three-term US Congressman from Tennessee, officer in the United States Army, and a Confederate brigadier general during the American Civil War

Religion
 Henry B. Eyring (born 1933), educator, Stanford University professor, Presiding Elder of the Church of Jesus Christ of Latter-day Saints
 Daniel Kumler Flickinger (1824–1911), Bishop of the Church of the United Brethren in Christ
 Martin Marty (1834–1886), Benedictine priest
 Philip Schaff (1819–1893), Protestant theologian and a historian of the Christian church

Scientists and engineers
 Alexander Emanuel Agassiz (1835–1910), geologist and zoologist
 Louis Agassiz (1807–1873), zoologist, glaciologist, and geologist, the husband of educator Elizabeth Cabot Cary Agassiz, and one of the first world-class American scientists
 Berni Alder (1925–2020), physicist
 David Alter (1807–1881), inventor, almost discovered spectroscopy
 Othmar Ammann (1879–1965), civil engineer
 Adolph Francis Alphonse Bandelier (1840–1914), archeologist
 Felix Bloch (1905–1983), physicist
 Armand Borel (1923–2003), mathematician
 Wilhelm (Willy) Burgdorfer (1925-2014), medical entomologist 
 Hans R. Camenzind (1934–2012), inventor of the 555 timer IC
 Florian Cajori (1859–1930), mathematician
 Robert Frank (1924–2019), important figure in American photography and film
 Albert Einstein (1879–1955), theoretical physicist widely regarded as the most important scientist of the 20th century and one of the greatest physicists of all time
 Henry Eyring (1901–1981), Mexican born American, theoretical chemist, associate of Albert Einstein
 Edmond H. Fischer (1920–2021), biochemist
 Walter Gautschi (born 1927), mathematician
 Otto Frederick Hunziker (1873–1959), dairy educator and technologist
 Josias Joesler (1895–1927), architect
 John Kruesi (1843–1899), inventor and close associate of Thomas Edison
 Adolf Meyer (1866–1950), psychiatrist
 Jean Piccard (1884–1963), scientist and high-altitude balloonist
 Louis François de Pourtalès (1824–1880), naturalist
 Adolph Rickenbacker (1886–1976), pioneer of the electric guitar; founder of the Rickenbacker guitar company, whose products would be an important influence on 1960s music through, among others, The Beatles, The Who and The Byrds
 Eddie Rickenbacker (1890–1973), automobile race car driver and automotive designer, hero of World War I, government consultant in military matters and a pioneer in air transportation
 Max Theiler (1899–1972), virologist, awarded the Nobel Prize in Physiology or Medicine for developing a vaccine against yellow fever

Sports
 Valeri Bure (born 1974), former ice hockey player, naturalized American citizen
 Martin Buser (born 1958), champion of sled dog racing
 Louis Chevrolet (1878–1941), racing driver; founder of the Chevrolet Motor Car Company, now the most famous brand of General Motors
Joey Daccord (born 1996), NHL goaltender currently playing for the Ottawa Senators; born in Boston to a Swiss mother
 Phil Dalhausser (born 1980), Olympic beach volleyball champion; born in Baden to German father and Swiss mother
 Brett Favre (born 1969), former NFL quarterback
 Bobby Fischer (1943–2008), controversial world chess champion
 Dan Fritsche (born 1985), former ice hockey player
 Pudge Heffelfinger (1867–1954), first professional football player
 Jeff Hostetler (born 1961), quarterback in the NFL for the New York Giants, Los Angeles/Oakland Raiders, and Washington Redskins.
 Fred Merkle (1888–1956), baseball player
 Alexia Paganini (born 2001), figure skater, Swiss father
 Alexander Ritschard (born 1994), tennis player, naturalized American citizen
 Ben Roethlisberger (born 1982), quarterback in the NFL for the Pittsburgh Steelers
 Simone Schaller (1912–2016), Olympic hurdler, Swiss father
Cory Schneider (born 1986), NHL goaltender
 Rudolph "Minnesota Fats" Wanderone (1913–1996), perhaps the best known pool player in the United States
 Ben Zobrist, second baseman in Major League Baseball

Other
 Helen Keller (1880–1968), author, political activist and lecturer; first deafblind person to earn a Bachelor of Arts degree
 Christoph Meili (born 1968), whistleblower
 Chesley Sullenberger (born 1951), airline transport pilot who successfully carried out the emergency ditching of US Airways Flight 1549 in the Hudson River, saving the lives of the 155 people on the aircraft

See also
List of Amish and their descendants

References

External links
 List of Swiss-Americans
 Forefathers in Switzerland
 OltreconfiniTi, the official website dedicated to Ticinese emigration
 San Joaquin Valley Swiss Club (California, US)
 Swiss American Historical Society

Swiss

Americans
Swiss